is a Japanese manga artist. She made her debut in 2000 in a special edition of Petit Comic with Watashi no Iru Basho (The Place Where I Am), and later worked on the manga adaptation of Socrates in Love. Her current work Dōse Mō Nigerarenai has been released in nine volumes by Shogakukan.

Works

References

External links 
 

Living people
Women manga artists
Manga artists from Aichi Prefecture
Japanese female comics artists
Female comics writers
21st-century Japanese women writers
Japanese writers
Year of birth missing (living people)